Dalbergia retusa (Caviuna, Cocobolo, Cocobolo Prieto, Funeram, Granadillo, Jacarandáholz, Nambar, ñamba, Nicaraguan Rosewood, Palisander, Palissandro, Palo Negro, Pau Preto, Rosewood, Urauna) is a plant species in the genus Dalbergia found in Pacific regions of Central America, ranging from Panama to southwestern Mexico. It produces the cocobolo wood. It is a fair-sized tree, reported to reach 20–25 m in height. This is probably the species contributing most of the wood in the trade. Because of the wood's great beauty and high value, the trees yielding this wood have been heavily exploited and are now rare outside national parks, reserves, and plantations.

Retusin, an O-methylated flavonoid, is produced by the tree.

See also
 Na 'Aina Kai Botanical Gardens
 Rosewood

References

External links
 
 

retusa
Trees of Central America

Critically endangered flora of North America